The Institute for Information communication Technology Planning and evaluation (정보통신기획평가원, IITP) is an South Korea government institution that manages ICT research and development (R&D) under the Ministry of Science and ICT (과학기술정보통신부, MSIT). Its main activities are setting ICT policy, ICT R&D management, and ICT HR Development. Since 2013, IITP has been developing the Test of Practical Competency in ICT (TOPCIT) for standardizing the ICT qualification in Korea.

History
The IITP first began as the Institute of Information Technology Advancement when it merged with Information & Telecommunication Technology Promotion Center on April 4, 2014. Then it was annexed to National IT Promotion Agency on June 5 of the same year, changing the name to the Institute for Information and Communications Technology Planning and evaluation.

Primary Missions

- Strategies for mid- and long-term ICT R&D technologies and planning technologies
- ICT R&D policy research, information survey, analysis and service
- Agreement, assessment, and support to ICT technology development projects
- Promotion for propagation of R&D achievements, technology transfer and commercialization
- Promotion of technology value assessment and transactions

References

External links

 Institute for Information and Communications Technology Promotion
 Institute for Information and Communications Technology Promotion 
 Test of Practical Competency in ICT

Government agencies of South Korea